Mohammad Khalil may refer to:
Mohammad Khalil (cricketer), Pakistani cricketer
Mohammad Aslam Khan Khalil, physicist
Mohammad Hassan Khalil, professor
Mohammad Hasan Khalil al-Hakim, terrorist
Mohammad Khalil Naik, Kashmiri politician